Amselina minorita is a moth in the family Autostichidae. It was described by László Anthony Gozmány in 1968. It is found in Turkey.

References

Moths described in 1968
Amselina